Ryan Lewis (born April 15, 1994) is an American football cornerback for the San Antonio Brahmas of the XFL. He played college football at the University of Pittsburgh. He was signed by the Arizona Cardinals as an undrafted free agent and has been a member of the New England Patriots, Buffalo Bills, Indianapolis Colts, Philadelphia Eagles, Miami Dolphins, Washington Football Team, and New York Giants.

College career
Lewis attended the University of Pittsburgh, where he played for head coach Paul Chryst, Joe Rudolph, and Pat Narduzzi in his four seasons. He recorded two interceptions his senior season, including one off of future-NFL quarterback Deshaun Watson in a 43-42 upset win over the then-#2 Clemson Tigers, and clinching the Panthers' victory over Pitt's rivals, the Penn State Nittany Lions.

Professional career

Arizona Cardinals
Lewis was signed by the Arizona Cardinals as an undrafted free agent on May 2, 2017. He was waived on September 2, 2017 and was signed to the practice squad the next day. He was released on September 12, 2017.

New England Patriots
On September 13, 2017, Lewis was signed to the New England Patriots' practice squad. With the Patriots, he made Super Bowl 52, but lost to the Philadelphia Eagles 41-33. He signed a reserve/future contract with the Patriots on February 6, 2018.

On August 31, 2018, Lewis was waived by the Patriots.

Buffalo Bills 
On September 2, 2018, Lewis was claimed by the Buffalo Bills. He was waived on September 12, 2018 and was re-signed to the practice squad. He was promoted back to the active roster on September 18, 2018. He was released during final roster cuts on August 31, 2019.

Indianapolis Colts
On September 1, 2019, Lewis was claimed off waivers by the Indianapolis Colts. He was released by the Colts on September 27, 2019.

Philadelphia Eagles
On October 1, 2019, Lewis was signed to the Philadelphia Eagles practice squad. He was promoted to the active roster on October 4. He was waived on October 14.

Miami Dolphins
On October 15, 2019, Lewis was claimed off waivers by the Miami Dolphins. In week 12 against the Cleveland Browns, Lewis recorded his first career interception off a pass thrown by Baker Mayfield in the 41–24 loss. He was placed on injured reserve on December 10, 2019, and was waived on July 29, 2020.

Washington Football Team
Lewis was claimed off waivers by the Washington Football Team on July 30, 2020, but was waived on September 5, 2020.

New York Giants
On September 8, 2020, Lewis was signed to the New York Giants practice squad. He was elevated to the active roster on September 19 for the team's week 2 game against the Chicago Bears, and reverted to the practice squad after the game. He was promoted to the active roster on September 22, 2020. He was placed on injured reserve on November 6. Lewis was waived after the season on April 14, 2021.

San Antonio Brahmas 
On November 17, 2022, Lewis was drafted by the San Antonio Brahmas of the XFL.

Personal life
Lewis is the son of Will Lewis, a former NFL cornerback and executive with the Seattle Seahawks, and a cousin of ESPN analyst Louis Riddick. Lewis has a girlfriend by the name Michaela Farrer and two dogs, Luna and Ziggy.

References

External links
Pittsburgh Panthers bio

1994 births
Living people
African-American players of American football
American football cornerbacks
Arizona Cardinals players
Buffalo Bills players
Indianapolis Colts players
Miami Dolphins players
New England Patriots players
Philadelphia Eagles players
Players of American football from Seattle
Pittsburgh Panthers football players
San Antonio Brahmas players
Washington Football Team players
New York Giants players
21st-century African-American sportspeople